was a town located in Adachi District, Fukushima Prefecture, Japan.

On December 1, 2005, Iwashiro, along with the towns of Adachi and Tōwa (all from Adachi District), was merged into the expanded city of Nihonmatsu.

As of 2003, the town had an estimated population of 9,002 and a density of 91.51 persons per km2. The total area was 98.37 km2. Obama Castle is located in Iwashiro.

External links
 Nihonmatsu official website 

Dissolved municipalities of Fukushima Prefecture
Nihonmatsu, Fukushima